Robert Riza (born 9 June 1999) is a Romanian professional footballer who plays as a left-back. Riza is a versatile player who can cover the position of left defender but also midfielder.

References

External links
 
 

1999 births
Living people
Sportspeople from Craiova
Romanian footballers
Association football midfielders
Liga I players
Liga II players
CS Concordia Chiajna players
FC Metaloglobus București players
FC U Craiova 1948 players
FC Astra Giurgiu players
AFC Chindia Târgoviște players
CSC 1599 Șelimbăr players